Betaenones are phytotoxins found in the fungus Pleospora betae. The compounds were found to inhibit a variety of protein kinases.

 Betaenone A
 Betaenone B
 Betaenone C

Two further betaenones were found in a species of the fungus Microsphaeropsis, which was isolated from the marine sponge Aplysina aerophoba.

References 

Decalins
Tertiary alcohols
Cyclic ketones